Military College Murree or MCM, is a military high school, located at Upper Topa, Murree Tehsil, District Rawalpindi, Pakistan. It was inaugurated by COAS Gen.Ashfaq Pervaiz Kiyani NI(M),HI on 1st of September, 2008.

Military College Murree is one of the three military colleges in Pakistan. The institution is a feeder college to the Pakistan Military Academy, Kakul.

History
The college's foundation stone was laid on 1 September 2008 by the General Ashfaq Parvez Kayani.

Cadet life

The students are called cadets. Cadets take part in sports such as field hockey, football, basketball, volleyball, squash, tennis and horse riding. Fitness activities include judo, karate, gymnastics, jogging and running. Physical training (PT) is conducted in the morning and sports in the evening. Students are taught drill and shooting.

Names of the Entries
1st entry (28 Aug. 2008-28 Aug. 2010)
2nd entry (12 Aug. 2009-25 June 2011)
3rd entry (17 July 2010 – 28 June 2012) 
4th entry (15 Sep. 2011-4 July 2013)
5th entry Paladins (12 June 2010 – 14 June 2014)
6th entry (5 May 2011 – 9 June 2015)
7th entry (5 May 2012 – 4 June 2016) 
8th entry Adamantines (28 April 2012-June 2017)
9th entry (27 April 2013-June 2018)
10th entry (26 May 2014 - June 2019)
11th entry Janbaz (23 May 2015 - June 2020)
12th entry The Trend Changers (28 May 2016-June 2021)
13th entry (28 May 2017-June 2022)
15th entry (25 April 2019-June 2024)
16th entry (18 April 2020-June 2025)
17th entry (5 May 2021-June 2026)
18th entry Speaking Champ(10 May 2022-June 2027)

List of Commandants
Commandants and their tenure start dates are:

Houses
Military College Murree is a residential institution. Cadets are accommodated in the Hostels called "Houses". A House organizes its own social functions, excursions, prep, indoor and outdoor games and sports. Each house is in the charge of a House Master, Assistant House Master, Officer and one Non Commissioned Officer from Pakistan Army. The college is divided into six houses.

Facilities and miscellaneous
Library:
The Academic Block maintains a central library.

Computer Labs:
The college has computer laboratory, equipped with high quality computers, multimedia and round the clock internet access.

Labs:
The college also has labs for Physics, Chemistry and Biology.

Medical:
The college has a hospital headed by an AMC Officer Doctor, with staff. For specialized treatment, the boys are sent to Combined Military Hospital (CMH) Murree or CMH Rawalpindi.

Students are medically examined and an individual health record is maintained. The college also has an isolation ward for the segregation of patients with infectious diseases.

Clubs:
Some of the major clubs include Arts Club, Science Club, Karate, Gymnastic, Debate & Other Clubs.

Recreational Activities:
Picnics are arranged and the boys are taken to recreational spots around Murree, Azad Khasmir & Taxila. Educational visits are part of the training schedule at the college.

College magazine:
The College Magazine is published annually in two sections (English/Urdu) and contains articles and essays written by the students. Every student is given a copy.

Activities
Cricket
Squash
Cross Country
Football
Basketball
Field Hockey
Physical Training
Indoor games
Athletics
Shooting
Computer Research
Self-Defence Training
Horse Riding
Polo
Volleyball
Martial Arts
Cyber Research
Language Laboratory
Virtual Classrooms

See also
Military College Jhelum
Military College Sui
Army Burn Hall College
PAF Public School Sargodha

References

External links
 New official website of MCM
Military College Jhelum alumni website: (www.alamgirian.org)
 Military College Jhelum Alumni Website: (www.militarycollegejhelum.com)
 MCJ website (This website has been merged with official Alamgirian websites)

Military schools in Pakistan
Pakistan Military Academy